Graham Fleury (born: 28 June 1959) is a sailor from Otahuhu, New Zealand. who represented his country at the 1992 Summer Olympics in Barcelona, Spain as crew member in the Soling. With helmsman Russell Coutts and fellow crew member Simon Daubney they took the 8th place.

References

Living people
1959 births
New Zealand male sailors (sport)
Sailors at the 1992 Summer Olympics – Soling
Olympic sailors of New Zealand
Sportspeople from Auckland